Cheshmeh-ye Beygi (also Romanized as Cheshmeh-ye Beygī) is a village in Shirez Rural District, Bisotun District, Harsin County, Kermanshah Province, Iran. At the 2006 census, its population was 195, in 41 families.

References 

Populated places in Harsin County